The 2006–07 Rochdale A.F.C. season was the club's 86th season in the Football League, and the 33rd consecutive season in the bottom division of the League. Rochdale finished the season in 9th place in League Two.

Statistics 
																												
				
				
				
				
				
				
				
				
				
				
				
				
				
				
				
				
				
				
				
				
				
				
				
				
				
				
				
				
				
				
				
				
				
				
				
				
				
				
				
				
				
				
				
				
|}

Competitions

Pre-season Friendlies

League Two

F.A. Cup

League Cup

League Trophy

References

Rochdale A.F.C. seasons
Rochdale